The 2016–17 Wyoming Cowboys basketball team represented the University of Wyoming during the 2016–17 NCAA Division I men's basketball season. Their head coach was Allen Edwards in his first year. They played their home games at the Arena-Auditorium in Laramie, Wyoming as a member of the Mountain West Conference. They finished the season 23–15, 8–10 in Mountain West play to finish in seventh place. They lost in the first round of the Mountain West tournament to Air Force. They were invited to the College Basketball Invitational where they defeated Eastern Washington, UMKC and Utah Valley to advance to the best-of-three finals series against Coastal Carolina. They defeated Coastal Carolina 2 games to 1 to become CBI champions. They become the second consecutive Mountain West team to win the CBI after Nevada in 2016.

Previous season
The Cowboys finished the season 14–18, 7–11 in Mountain West play to finish in a tie for eighth place. They lost in the first round of the Mountain West tournament to Utah State. On March 21, head coach Larry Shyatt resigned.

Departures

Incoming transfers

Incoming Recruits

2017 Recruiting Class

Roster

Statistics

Schedule and results

|-
!colspan=9 style="background:#492f24; color:#ffc425;"| Exhibition

|-
!colspan=9 style="background:#492f24; color:#ffc425;"| Non-conference regular season

|-
!colspan=9 style="background:#492f24; color:#ffc425;"| Mountain West regular season

|-
!colspan=9 style="background:#492f24; color:#ffc425;"| Mountain West tournament

|-
!colspan=9 style="background:#492f24; color:#ffc425;"| CBI

References

Wyoming Cowboys basketball seasons
Wyoming
Wyoming
College Basketball Invitational championship seasons
Wyoming Cowboys bask
Wyoming Cowboys bask